Mariano Sánchez Martinez (born 1 February 1959) is a Spanish former professional racing cyclist. He rode in one edition of the Tour de France and eight editions of the Vuelta a España.

References

External links
 

1959 births
Living people
Spanish male cyclists
People from Alcoià
Sportspeople from the Province of Alicante
Cyclists from the Valencian Community